Anthony Hassiotis is a Greek born banker who is Chief Executive Officer of Eurobank EFGs Romania subsidiary since July 9, 2012.  He was born to a family of a Greek banker and completed his studies in the US before starting a career in banking.

He was the CEO and Chairman of the Management Board of Bulgarian Postbank from October 2004 to July 2012.

Background 
Anthony Hassiotis worked in a variety of senior executive positions at Citibank for seventeen years beginning in 1982. His career with Citibank took him to positions in a number of other countries, including Costa Rica, Greece, Saudi Arabia, Venezuela and the U.S. In 1999, he was appointed CEO of Barclays Bank in Greece and country manager of Barclays Group. In 2001, he was appointed deputy governor and vice chairman of the board of directors of the Agricultural Bank of Greece. In 2002, he was appointed chairman and CEO of the General Bank of Greece.

He was elected to the board of the Confederation of Industrialists and Employers in Bulgaria in 2008 and served as chairman of the board of the Hellenic Business Council in Bulgaria until July 2009. He was president of the (American Chamber of Commerce) in Bulgaria until 2010.

Awards 
 2007 Bulgarian Banker Weekly Banker of the Year.

See also
 Bulgarian Postbank

References

Living people
Bulgarian businesspeople
University of Arizona alumni
Year of birth missing (living people)